Ginny Aiken (born 8 June 1955) is an author of inspirational fiction as well as mystery novels. Ginny was born in Havana, Cuba, and grew up in Valencia and Caracas, Venezuela.

The former newspaper reporter discovered books early on and wrote her first novel at age fifteen. That effort was followed years later by award-winning and best-selling titles in the secular and Christian markets. Aiken holds certification in French literature and culture from the University of Nancy, France, as well as a B. A. from Allegheny College in Pennsylvania. She lives in South-Central Pennsylvania.

Books by Ginny Aiken

Bellamy's Blossoms 
Published by Tyndale

 Magnolia, 2000
 Lark, 2000
 Camellia, 2001

Silver Hills Trilogy 
Published by Revell

 Light of My Heart, 2004
 Song of My Soul, 2004
 Spring of My Love, 2005

Deadly Decor Mysteries 
Published by Revell

 Design On a Crime, 2005
 Decorating Schemes, 2006
 Interior Motives, 2006

Shop-Til-U-Drop 
Published by Revell

 Priced to Move, 2007
 A Steal of a Deal, 2008
 A Cut Above, 2008

References

External links
 Author page at Tyndale
 Historical Romance Writers

Christian writers
Living people
American mystery writers
American women novelists
Cuban emigrants to the United States
21st-century American novelists
Nancy-Université alumni
Women mystery writers
21st-century American women writers
Writers from Havana
Cuban women writers
Women religious writers
1955 births